James A. Symonds (born February 7, 1954) is an American retired rear admiral of the United States Navy who last served as Commander, Navy Region Northwest, based in Silverdale, Washington. He was the former commanding officer of the aircraft carrier . He had a prominent, symbolic role in the state funeral of former United States President Ronald Reagan in 2004.

Early life and education
Symonds is a native of Sodus, New York. He attended the State University of New York at Albany and graduated with a Bachelor's degree in mathematics in 1975. He later was commissioned at the Aviation Officer Candidate School at Naval Air Station Pensacola, Florida that September and was designated a Naval Flight Officer in July 1976.

Military career
Symonds served one operational tour assigned as an A-6 Intruder bombardier/navigator in Attack Squadron 115, aboard the aircraft carrier . In 1983, he became a naval aviator after being selected for pilot training and returned to Naval Air Station Whidbey Island. He then participated in two additional operational tours with Attack Squadron 196, and was deployed on board  and  amidst Operation Desert Storm.

In 1995 he attended Navy Nuclear Power Training.

USS Ronald Reagan

He presided over the ship's transfer from Norfolk, Virginia to its homeport in San Diego, California.

On June 5, 2004, while Symonds was commanding officer, former president Ronald Reagan, the ship's namesake, died at his home in California. Upon former First Lady Nancy Reagan's request, the commanding officer of USS Ronald Reagan would present her the American flag that draped the president's casket; at the time, it was Symonds. Following a national funeral service in the Washington National Cathedral and six days of public mourning, Symonds presented Nancy Reagan with the flag at President Reagan's gravesite at the Ronald Reagan Presidential Library prior to his interment.

Recent career
Symonds turned over command of USS Ronald Reagan to Captain Terry Kraft on November 17, 2005. His more recent posts have been Navy Director of Environmental Readiness and commander of the Navy Region Northwest, a position he took up in July 2007.

Awards

 Defense Superior Service Medal
 Legion of Merit (three awards)
 Meritorious Service Medal (four awards)

 Strike Flight Medal
 Navy and Marine Corps Commendation Medal (three awards)
 Navy and Marine Corps Achievement Medal (two awards)

Footnotes

Living people
United States Navy admirals
University at Albany, SUNY alumni
Recipients of the Legion of Merit
Recipients of the Defense Superior Service Medal
People from Sodus, New York
People from Silverdale, Washington
1954 births